Walter J. Kozloski (March 6, 1935 – November 25, 1979) was an American politician who served in the New Jersey General Assembly from the 11th Legislative District from 1974 to 1979.

References

1935 births
1979 deaths
Democratic Party members of the New Jersey General Assembly
Politicians from Monmouth County, New Jersey
20th-century American politicians